Surviving You, Always is the second album and first LP by post-hardcore band Saccharine Trust, released in 1984 through SST. Guitarist Joe Baiza was exploring Jazz at the time at the influence was reflected on the album. Much of the lyrical content contains biblical imagery. The album features a cover of "Peace Frog" by The Doors a song repeated on Saccharine Trust's live compilation Past Lives.

The cover is based on the photo by photography student Robert Wiles of Evelyn McHale, who committed suicide by jumping from the 86th floor Observation Deck of the Empire State Building on May 1, 1947.

Track listing

Personnel 
Saccharine Trust
Joe Baiza – guitar, vocals on "The Cat.Cracker"
Jack Brewer – vocals
Tony Cicero – drums
Mark Hodson – bass guitar
Additional musicians and production
Russell Conlin – cornet on "Yhwh on Acid"
Rick Cox – alto saxophone on "The Cat.Cracker"
Saccharine Trust – production
Spot – production, engineering
R.C. Wills – illustrations

References 

1984 debut albums
Albums produced by Spot (producer)
SST Records albums
Saccharine Trust albums